Mamo Sebsibe (born 24 September 1944) is an Ethiopian former middle-distance runner who competed at the 1964 and 1968 Summer Olympics.

References

Living people
1944 births
Ethiopian male middle-distance runners
Olympic athletes of Ethiopia
Athletes (track and field) at the 1964 Summer Olympics
Athletes (track and field) at the 1968 Summer Olympics
20th-century Ethiopian people
21st-century Ethiopian people